Alsager railway station serves the town of Alsager in Cheshire, England. It stands next to a level crossing and is approximately 600 yards from the town centre. The station is owned by Network Rail and managed by East Midlands Railway.

The station is unstaffed. The full range of tickets for travel are purchased from the guard on the train at no extra cost.

History 

It was opened by the North Staffordshire Railway company on 9 October 1848; later becoming part of the London, Midland and Scottish Railway during the Grouping of 1923. The line then passed on to the London Midland Region of British Railways on nationalisation in 1948.

When sectorisation was introduced in the 1980s, the station was served by Regional Railways until the privatisation of British Rail.

The line through Alsager was electrified in 2003, so that it could be used as a diversionary route between Kidsgrove and Crewe during West Coast Main Line improvement work.

Services 
Services at Alsager are operated by East Midlands Railway using Class 156, 158 and 170 DMUs and by London Northwestern Railway using Class 350 EMUs.

The typical off-peak service in trains per hour is:
 1 tph to 
 1 tph to  via  and 
 2 tph to 

On Sundays, there is an hourly service between Crewe and Birmingham throughout the day. Hourly Sunday services operate between Crewe and Derby after 14:00 only.

References 
Notes

Sources
 
 
 
 Station on navigable O.S. map

External links 

Pictures of the station during diversions

Railway stations in Cheshire
DfT Category F1 stations
Former North Staffordshire Railway stations
Railway stations in Great Britain opened in 1848
Railway stations served by East Midlands Railway
Railway stations served by West Midlands Trains